"Hunted" is a 2019 comic book storyline published by Marvel Comics, starring the character Spider-Man. It is a spiritual successor to the 1987 storyline "Kraven's Last Hunt". It involves the characters Spider-Man, Black Cat, Kraven the Hunter, Lizard, Vulture, and Taskmaster as well as the debut of the Last Son of Kraven.

Synopsis

Prelude
In a prelude to "Hunted," Kraven the Hunter reminisces about how Sasha, Vladimir, and Alyosha were killed by him and Ana for not living up to his legacy. After cutting a deal with the High Evolutionary who only met with him after some of his New Men were hunted, Kraven the Hunter has 87 clones of him created. Ana was disgusted by this and leaves her father. The clones were trained as the Sons of Kraven and then sent out to prove themselves by being hunted by each other. This motif caused Ana to leave him. The one that survived was labeled as the Last Son of Kraven. With help from Taskmaster, Black Ant, and Arcade and his company Arcade Industries, Kraven the Hunter starts hunting various animal-themed characters like Beetle, Kangaroo, Owl, Puma, the Serpent Society (Black Mamba, Black Racer, Bushmaster, Cottonmouth, Fer-de-Lance, Puff Adder, Rock Python), Squid, and White Rabbit. In the case of King Cobra, Rhino, Scorpion, Stegron, Tarantula, and Vulture, they were grouped together as the Savage Six. While making the final preparations for the "Great Hunt," Kraven the Hunter recaps on his own immortality when it was revealed that the Kraven the Hunter that was stabbed by Scarlet Spider was actually a clone.

Curt Connors (in his Lizard form due to the Dead No More: The Clone Conspiracy) wakes up to find his wife screaming that his son Billy Connors isn't home. Peter Parker is sick due to his encounters with Taskmaster and Black Ant when they tried to capture the Rhino. Mary Jane offers to give Peter some food to make him feel better, but Peter receives six calls from Curt Connors about Billy. Meanwhile, Billy is trying to get into a club to see a girl named Becca. But when security catches him and exposes his Lizard-like appearance, security chase after Billy. Taskmaster and Black Ant quickly capture Billy and escape from Spider-Man. Spider-Man receives a spider tracer from Black Cat stating that she has been captured with Billy, but not before sending Spider-Man her location.

Main plot
Spider-Man is swinging throughout New York, still weakened because of the flu. He arrives at the place where Black Cat is supposedly held and falls into a trap where there are green gases that make Spider-Man disoriented. Black Cat is in a hotel room with Billy Connors, where she was captured by Taskmaster and Black Ant due to them double-crossing her. Kraven arrives to see Black Cat, and it is revealed that Black Cat and Billy are bait for Spider-Man. Meanwhile, Spider-Man gets dizzier when he sees the Last Son of Kraven. Spider-Man manages to get the upper hand, but hallucinates Mary Jane dying, which causes the Last Son of Kraven to beat him senselessly. Spider-Man wakes up in Central Park in his black suit where he is attacked by Scorpion with the rest of the Savage Six, Armadillo, Black Mamba, Black Tarantula, Constrictor II, Frog-Man, Gazelle of the Salem's Seven, Gibbon, Hippo, Iguana, Kangaroo, Killer Shrike, Man-Bull, Owl, Panda-Mania, Puma, Slug, Squid, Toad, Walrus, and White Rabbit watch the fight. The fight is interrupted when they are attacked by robots piloted by hunters.

Spider-Man is helping the Savage Six, Armadillo, Beetle, Bison, Constrictor II, Dragonfly, Flying Tiger, Frog-Man, Gazelle, Gibbon, Iguana, Killer Shrike, Mad Dog, Man-Bull, Owl, Puma, the Serpent Society, Squid, Toad, Walrus, and White Rabbit escape from the Hunter-Bots, but there is almost no escape as there is a forcefield around Central Park, even Captain Marvel, Iron Man, War Machine, and Vision couldn't break through it. This forcefield is the remnant of the Planetary Defense Shield that was misused by Hydra back in the "Secret Empire" storyline. Arcade shows the hunters how to operate the Hunter-Bots where a hunter named Bob controls one to kill Iguana. Bison, Gazelle, and Mad Dog are killed by the Hunter-Bots. Mary Jane is dancing in her apartment but stops when she gets worried for Peter. Spider-Man tries to help Gibbon, but Vulture tells Gibbon to get away from Spider-Man as after this is over Spider-Man will just lock Gibbon up again. Black Ant and Taskmaster are talking about the Hunt. Taskmaster betrays Black Ant saying that Black Ant is an animal-themed villain and tasers Black Ant to get more money. While running away, Vulture pushes Gibbon toward the hunters in order to buy some time for himself, which causes Gibbon to be killed. While fighting the hunters, Peter Parker grows worried for Mary Jane, because he fears that his hallucination may become true. Mary Jane wakes up from her sleep to find a centipede in her hair and puts it outside and goes back to sleep, but a demonic bandaged-covered figure with centipedes on him watches over.

Spider-Man comes across Gibbon's corpse and grieves over him. As Spider-Man stays by his side, Gibbon reflects on his life where he even came to the conclusion that Princess Python never loved him.

Spider-Man is caught by surprise by a couple of Hunter-Bots and Spider-Man listens to their conversation about Arcade, realizing that the hunters are just robots. Spider-Man webs the Hunter-Bots up and while swinging he sees arrow signs all over Central Park, and heads toward a location where the Savage Six are located. The arrows are revealed to be v shapes and it was for the Vulture. Vulture creates a lie to the rest of the Savage Six, Armadillo, Constrictor II, Human Fly, Owl, Puma, Razorback II, Scorpia, Snake Marston, and White Rabbit that Gibbon sacrificed himself to give Vulture time to break the forcefield and give him a robot head. Spider-Man lands in front of the villain to say that Vulture lied, but Rhino appears. Rhino is still angry that Spider-Man allowed Taskmaster and Black Ant to capture him (due to Aunt May being in the way) and is about to kill him when Vulture tells Rhino to calm down as Spider-Man is not the enemy but the Robot Hunters are. Spider-Man mentions that Mandrill was taken down by the Hunter-Bots while Toad mentions that the same thing happened to Man-Bull. Black Cat uses her bad luck powers to set a leopard free from its cage and attack one of the guards. Black Cat gets the key and tells Billy to escape. However, Billy wants to stay in the cage so his dad will find him. Taskmaster meets Arcade and wants Arcade to pay him twice the money because Taskmaster caught Lizard. Spider-Man encounters one of the Hunter-Bots who revealed Arcade's location and destroys it. Black Ant then shows up to tells Spider-Man something.

It is revealed that in order to save his son and his wife from disintegrating (due to the events of "Dead No More: The Clone Conspiracy" where Jackal activated the kill code), Curt injected them with the Lizard formula, turning into Lizard. Curt also put an inhibitor chip in his spine which prevents him from being violent as well as turn him to human form. Lizard finds Taskmaster at the Pop-Up with No Name. The Pop-Up with No Name is a beer tent at the Queens Night Market that patrons like 8-Ball, Answer, Boomerang, Electro II, Hypno-Hustler, Looter, Mirage, Paper Doll, Screwball, Spot, and Tombstone have been attending ever since the Bar with No Name was blown up. Lizard proceeds to poison him by slipping a poison into her beer. Lizard offers Taskmaster the antidote if he can take Lizard to Central Park. While traveling there, Lizard and Taskmaster defeat Vermin, freeing innocent bystanders. Taskmaster helps put a taser chip in Lizard's body, and takes him to Arcade.

Black Ant tells Spider-Man that the only way to escape the Central Park is to leave all the villains and by turning small. Taskmaster frees Lizard from his binds and Lizard tells Taskmaster that the poison will wear off in 24 hours. Black Cat is sneaking around with Billy still crying when Black Cat is attacked by Hunter-Bot. Last Son of Kraven is impatient with the Great Hunt and wants to hunt the animal-themed individuals. He also deduces that Kraven hasn't entered the Great Hunt because he's afraid of Spider-Man and walks away. The Hunter-Bot sees Billy and shoots, but Black Cat jumps in the way. The Hunter-Bots plans to finish off Billy. Upon seeing him as a kid, the Hunter-Bot decides to quit hunting. Billy helps Black Cat on her feet and they slowly walk away with Black Cat bleeding out. Lizard finds the cage that Billy was in, but Last of Kraven finds Lizard and beats him up. Last Son of Kraven realizes that Lizard can't fight and declares that he will kill Billy in front of Lizard while dragging him away. The Hunter-Bot tries to disconnect, but he can't. It is revealed that the moment the individual connects to the Hunter-Bot and if is destroyed, then the individual is killed which is what happens when Vulture destroys Bob's Hunter-Bot. The Hunter-Bots are then attacked by the Savage Six, Armadillo, Black Mamba, Dragonfly, Frog-Man, Hippo, Lady Octopus, Puma, Razorback, and Toad when they try to target White Rabbit. Kraven plans this from the beginning to punish the hunters for killing animals for sport. Black Ant tells Spider-Man that Kraven is located in a castle, but Arcade tells Spider-Man that Kraven is busy and releases the Vermin clones.

In a flashback, Kraven has Arcade tell Vulture that there is a chance to break the forcefield by killing more Hunter-Bots. In the present, Vermin is being kept captured by Arcade who found him due to Taskmaster and Lizard showing Arcade his location. Vermin bites Arcade's finger in defiance. In fear of being killed by Arcade, Vermin reveals that Lizard and Taskmaster are working against Arcade. Arcade puts a serum into Vermin's skin causing him to spawn clones of him in the cage.

As the Savage Six, Killer Shrike, Lady Octopus, Ox, and White Rabbit continue to take down the Hunter-Bots, Spider-Man is overwhelmed by the Vermin clones. Just when he is about to be killed, Kraven the Hunter repels the Vermin clones and saves Spider-Man. He heals Spider-Man dresses him in a new black Spider-Man costume. Spider-Man is met by Curt Connors who is in human form. Black Cat and Billy take a breather and Billy reveals that his dad will come. However, he doesn't want his dad to find Billy. It is revealed that when Billy was revived, the body was of a clone. However, Billy's true spirit resides in the clone body. Curt knows this because he talked to Doctor Strange about it. Last Son of Kraven appears in front of Black Cat and Billy about to kill both of them. Curt pleads that Spider-Man rip out the inhibitor chip out of his back, stating that he needs to save Billy and promises to be in control. Spider-Man relents enough to pass Kraven's test, and the Lizard re-emerges to break free out of the jail.

Kraven finally lets Spider-Man from his bonds, but Spider-Man sees dead guards. Kraven meets Spider-Man and he slashes Spider-Man up with his knives. Kraven tries to get in Spider-Man's head by saying that it is his fault that the guards are dead, as Spider-Man was willing to risk Curt's life in order to be free. Kraven reveals that if Spider-Man kills Kraven, then the forcefield will be down as well as the Hunter-Bots being deactivated and Black Cat and Billy will be saved. Before Spider-Man blacks out, he remembers Mary Jane and starts beating up Kraven. Lizard saves Billy in the nick of time and briefly reconciles with Billy before wandering off allowing Last Son of Kraven to escape. Spider-Man tells Kraven that he will never be like Kraven because Kraven will do anything to survive including killing his own kin like he did with Sasha, Vladimir, and Alyosha. However, Spider-Man counters that everyone needs some other person to support and care for another in order to survive. Kraven laughs and tells Arcade to deactivate the force field and the Hunter-Bots. This enables the Savage Six, Armadillo, Frog-Man, Hippo, Kangaroo, Owl, Panda-Mania, Puma, Scorpia, the Serpent Society, Squid, and White Rabbit to get out of Central Park. Kraven tells Spider-Man to save Black Cat and when Spider-Man hesitates, Kraven promises to never hunt again. Kraven goes to his casket where he retrieves the black Spider-Man suit and dons it once more. Last Son of Kraven sees "Spider-Man" and mistakenly kills Kraven, breaking his curse. It was said that Kraven must die by the spider and since Kraven wore the Spider-Man suit, this causes Kraven's "son" to kill him. At the end of the issue on the casket is a photo of Kraven and the Sons of Kraven all happy.

Aftermath
After attending his funeral of his "father," Last Son of Kraven went to the Kravinoff estate, rips off his clothes, and trashed it out of frustration. Swinging through Central Park, Spider-Man sees that the Great Hunt is over. Though Armadillo, the Serpent Society, and the unidentified animal-themed villains are shown engaging the police. Luckily, the Avengers (consisting of Iron Man, Black Panther, Doctor Strange, She-Hulk), Falcon, and the Fantastic Four (consisting of Mister Fantastic, Invisible Woman, Human Torch, and Thing) arrive to subdue them. Human Torch is pleased that Spider-Man survived. Captain Marvel shows up to confront Arcade while the controllers of the Hunter-Bots are confronted by Captain America who plans to have a conversation with them about New York's hunting laws. The Great Hunt participants are also arrested. Vulture tells King Cobra, Rhino, Scorpion, Stegron, and Tarantula that the Savage Six name has a good ring to it. Black Ant is found hiding in the bushes by Yellowjacket as he, Human Fly, Razorback, Toad, and White Rabbit plan to take revenge on him. Just then, Taskmaster appears and makes off with Black Ant. As they leave, Taskmaster states that Black Ant would've done the same for him. When Black Ant asks "Do you mean the betrayal part or the rescue part?" All Taskmaster can say is "yeah!" Black Cat reunites Billy with Martha Connors' lizard form in their sewer home. Curt Connors is unconscious somewhere as he regains his conscious upon becoming Lizard again. Some of Vermin's surviving clones are seen lurking in the subway. Peter Parker arrives home to find Mary Jane with a bleeding arm. They both embrace each other as a centipede watches them. After calming down and drinking some wine, Last Son of Kraven found a letter written to him by his "father" behind Kraven the Hunter's rifle on the wall. The letter from Kraven the Hunter stated that Last Son of Kraven was to finally inherit his legacy not as Kraven's son, but as the man himself since he was cloned from his DNA. Last Son of Kraven read on the letter "You were forged in fire, born in blood. My spirit made flesh. More than my child -- you are me, and I am you. One and the same now." This led to Last Son of Kraven taking on the aliases of Sergei Kravinoff and Kraven the Hunter where he cuts his hair, wipes off his tiger stripes, and dons a copy of Kraven the Hunter's outfit. Back at the funeral, Chameleon is revealed to be one of the attendees as he is pleased that Kraven the Hunter spared him from the Great Hunt. As he walks away, Chameleon quotes to his dead half-brother to sleep well and states "You needn't worry. The world is no longer your burden. Besides, there won't be much of it left soon...Not by the time I've finished."

Reception
The storyline received generally positive reviews, with critics praising the plot, art, and ending. The epilogue of the story did receive some criticism however.

According to Comic Book Roundup, Amazing Spider-Man Vol 5 Issue 16 received an average score of  7.1 out of 10 based on 14 reviews.

According to Comic Book Roundup, Issue 16 H.U Tie-In received a score of 7.2 out of 10 based on  4 reviews.

According to Comic Book Roundup, Issue 17 received a score of 8.4 out of 10 based on 12 reviews.

According to Comic Book Roundup, Issue 18 received a score of 6.8 out of 10 based on 12 reviews.

According to Comic Book Roundup, Issue 18 H.U Tie-In received a score of 8.1 out of 10 based on 8 reviews.

According to Comic Book Roundup, Issue 19 received a score of 7.9 out of 10 based on 10 reviews.

According to Comic Book Roundup, Issue 19 H.U Tie-In received a score of 8.3 out of 10 based on 6 reviews.

According to Comic Book Roundup, Issue 20 received a score of 8 out of 10 based on 9 reviews.

According to Comic Book Roundup, Issue 20 H.U Tie-In received a score of 6.8 out of 10 based on 4 reviews.

According to Comic Book Roundup, Issue 21 received a score of 8 out of 10 based on 10 reviews.

According to Comic Book Roundup, Issue 22 received a score of 7.6 out of 10 based on 13 reviews.

According to Comic Book Roundup, Issue 23 received a score of 7.3 out of 10 based on 13 reviews.

Collected edition

References

External links